Hryhoriy Huriyovych Veryovka (25 December 1895 in Berezna, Chernigovsky Uyezd, Chernigov Governorate, Russian Empire – 21 October 1964 in Kyiv, Ukrainian SSR) was a Soviet and Ukrainian composer and choir director.

He is best known for founding the renowned Veryovka Choir in 1943, and leading it for many years, gaining international recognition and winning multiple awards. Veryovka was also a professor of conducting at the Kyiv Conservatory, where he worked alongside faculty including Boleslav Yavorsky, Alexander Koshetz, Mykola Leontovych, and Mykhailo Verykivsky.

Veryovka was born in an old Cossack town of Berezna (today urban-type settlement). In 1916 he graduated from the Chernihiv Theological Seminary. In 1918-21 Veryovka studied at the Lysenko music school (a predecessor of the Kyiv Conservatory) studying a musical composition by Boleslav Yavorsky, conducting by Aleksander Orlov. In 1933 he received an external degree from the institute.

Since 1923 Veryovka continued to work at the Lysenko institute and later (from 1934) Kyiv Conservatory. During World War II in 1941-45 he was a scientist of the Rylsky Institute of Art Studies, Folklore and Ethnology.

In 1943 in Kharkiv, Veryovka organized his well known choir and until his death was its art director and a main conductor. In 1948-52 he headed the National Union of Composers of Ukraine.

References 

1895 births
1964 deaths
20th-century composers
20th-century conductors (music)
20th-century male musicians
Communist Party of the Soviet Union members
Academic staff of Kyiv Conservatory
People from Chernihiv Oblast
People from Chernigovsky Uyezd
Stalin Prize winners
Recipients of the Order of Lenin
Recipients of the Order of the Red Banner of Labour
Recipients of the Shevchenko National Prize
Recipients of the title of People's Artists of Ukraine
Male conductors (music)
Ukrainian people in the Russian Empire
Soviet conductors (music)
Soviet male composers
Soviet music educators
Ukrainian choral conductors
Ukrainian composers
Ukrainian conductors (music)
Ukrainian music educators

Burials at Baikove Cemetery